The Categoría Primera A, commonly referred to as Liga BetPlay Dimayor (between 2015 and 2019 Liga Águila) due to sponsorship by online betting company BetPlay, is a Colombian professional league for association football clubs. It is the country's premier football tournament and sits at the top of the Colombian football league system.

A total of twenty clubs compete in the league's regular season. División Mayor del Fútbol Profesional Colombiano, better known as DIMAYOR, operates the league system of promotion and relegation for both Categoría Primera A and Categoría Primera B leagues. Since its foundation in 1948, fifteen teams have been crowned as Colombian football champions. The most successful club is Atlético Nacional with 17 titles.

History
Before 1948 there was no professional football league in Colombia. The first clubs were formed in Barranquilla and Bogotá: Barranquilla FC, Polo Club, Escuela Militar and Bartolinos, although the game took a while to develop in popularity. The 1918 Campeonato Nacional was the first tournament played between Colombian clubs, followed by the Copa Centenario Batalla de Boyacá. Independiente Medellín, founded on 15 April 1913, is the oldest club that remains as a professional club.
The first tournament was organised by the Colombian Football Federation and DIMAYOR in 1948. Ten teams signed up for this first tournament, paying the required fee of 1,000 pesos). Two teams each signed on from Bogotá, Cali, Manizales, and Pereira, plus one from Barranquilla. 252 players were registered for that year's tournament, 182 of which were Colombians, 13 were Argentine, 8 Peruvian, 5 Uruguayan, 2 Chilean, 2 Ecuadorian, 1 Dominican, and 1 Spanish.

Soon after the league's foundation, disputes between Adefútbol (the body governing amateur football in Colombia) and DIMAYOR (the organizing body behind the new national league) erupted. DIMAYOR broke away from Adefútbol, announcing that it would operate independently of FIFA rules and regulations. In response, FIFA sanctioned Colombian football, banning the national team and all its clubs from international competition. This period, which lasted from 1949 to 1954, is known as El Dorado.

Far from being a dark time in Colombian football, this was its golden age. No longer required to pay transfer fees to clubs from other nations, Colombian clubs began importing stars from all over South America and Europe. The most aggressive signer of international players was Millonarios, which won consecutive championships with stars such as Alfredo di Stéfano. Attendances boomed, and the expanding appetite for club competitions resulted in the creation of the Copa Colombia in 1950. That knockout competition was played sporadically over the next 58 years and only became an annual tournament in 2008. Although the stars returned to their nations when Colombia rejoined the international fold in 1954, the era was never forgotten.

In 1968 the league followed the pattern emerging in South America by replacing its year-long tournament with two shorter ones. From this point forward, Colombian clubs would compete in two tournaments a year; the Apertura from February to June and the Finalización from July to December, which became independent championships in 2002. Another league restructuring came in 1991, with the addition of second and third divisions. The third division had its 2002 edition cancelled for economic reasons, and stopped awarding promotion to the professional tiers in 2003 until it was finally dropped in 2010.

Format
The current format of Colombian football was adopted for the 2019 season.  The top flight features 20 teams, all of which play through the Apertura and Finalización tournaments each year.  Both tournaments are conducted according to an identical three-stage format.

The first stage is conducted on a single round-robin basis, with each team playing the other teams once for a total of 19 matches. The top eight teams then advance to a knockout round consisting of two groups, each team playing six times in a round-robin format.  The two leaders of each group advance to the final, which is played in a home and away leg fashion.

Relegation to Categoría Primera B is determined by averaging the point totals achieved by teams over the previous three seasons.  Each year, the bottom two teams drop out and are replaced by the top two from Primera B.

Current teams

Seasons by club
This is the complete list of the clubs that have taken part in at least one Categoría Primera A season, founded in 1948, until the 2022 season. Teams that currently play are indicated in bold.

 75 seasons: Atlético Nacional (Atlético Municipal)
 75 seasons: Millonarios
 75 seasons: Santa Fe
 72 seasons: Deportivo Cali
 71 seasons: Independiente Medellín
 69 seasons: América de Cali
 69 seasons: Once Caldas (Deportes Caldas, Deportivo Manizales, Atlético Manizales)
 67 seasons: Deportes Tolima
 63 seasons: Atlético Bucaramanga
 62 seasons: Deportes Quindío (Atlético Quindío)
 62 seasons: Junior
 61 seasons: Deportivo Pereira
 57 seasons: Cúcuta Deportivo
 51 seasons: Unión Magdalena (Samarios)
 30 seasons: Envigado
 26 seasons: Atlético Huila
 22 seasons: Deportivo Pasto
 16 seasons: Boyacá Chicó (Bogotá Chicó)
 16 seasons: La Equidad
 16 seasons: Cortuluá

 12 seasons: Real Cartagena
 12 seasons: Águilas Doradas (Itagüí Ditaires, Águilas Pereira, Rionegro Águilas)
 11 seasons: Patriotas
 10 seasons: Alianza Petrolera
 9 seasons: Boca Juniors
 8 seasons: Sporting
 8 seasons: Jaguares
 5 seasons: Universidad
 4 seasons: Once Deportivo
 3 seasons: Huracán
 2 seasons: Fortaleza
 2 seasons: Uniautónoma
 2 seasons: Unicosta
 1 season: Deportivo Barranquilla
 1 season: Centauros Villavicencio
 1 season: Leones
 1 season: Libertad
 1 season: Oro Negro
 1 season: Tigres

Trophy
The same trophy has been used to commemorate the annual champion since 1948. Made of German silver, weighing roughly 5 kilos and measuring approximately 90 centimeters tall, in its upper part it has the figure of the Winged Victory of Samothrace, which has been used to represent sporting triumph with the passing of history. The original trophy is kept at the headquarters of DIMAYOR and is engraved with all the names of the champion clubs, with the champions being awarded an exact replica. Along with the competition's official trophy, the champions are also awarded an additional trophy handed over by the league's sponsor.

Clubs in international competitions

Players

Appearances

Top scorers

Champions by seasons

The only tournament that was not awarded to a champion occurred in 1989, after the assassination of referee Álvaro Ortega on October 1 in Medellín. All games, post-season games and international representation for the following year were cancelled.

Table

Source for champions and runners-up by season: RSSSF

List of champions

Source: RSSSF

References

External links

Dimayor Official Website
Colombian Federation
FiFa Association
Primera A – current season league table, recent results and upcoming fixtures at Soccerway

 
Colombia
1
Sports leagues established in 1948
1948 establishments in Colombia